Rotating beacon may refer to:
 Aerobeacon, a light assembly used to create a fixed or flashing signal visible over long distances
 Aerodrome beacon, a beacon installed at an airport or aerodrome to indicate its location to aircraft pilots at night
 Airway beacon, a rotating light assembly mounted atop a tower
 Emergency vehicle lighting, one or more visual warning lights fitted to a vehicle
 Lighthouse, a physical structure designed to emit light for navigational aid

See also
 Beacon (disambiguation)